Tom Strownix (2 May 1886 – 9 August 1971) was an Australian rules footballer who played with South Melbourne and Fitzroy in the Victorian Football League (VFL).

Notes

External links 

1886 births
1971 deaths
Australian rules footballers from Victoria (Australia)
Sydney Swans players
Fitzroy Football Club players
Nhill Football Club players
Australian rules footballers from South Australia